Hill Township is a township in Carroll County, in the U.S. state of Missouri.

Hill Township has the name of the local Hill family of pioneer citizens.

References

Townships in Missouri
Townships in Carroll County, Missouri